E. affinis  may refer to:
 Emberiza affinis, the brown-rumped bunting, a bird species found in Africa
 Eleutherodactylus affinis, a frog species endemic to Colombia
 Elops affinis, the Pacific tenpounder or Pacific ladyfish, a fish species
 Empidonax affinis, the pine flycatcher, a bird species found in Mexico and  Guatemala
 Eremobates affinis, an arachnid species
 Euphonia affinis, the scrub euphonia, a bird species found in Belize, Costa Rica, El Salvador, Guatemala, Honduras, Mexico and Nicaragua
 Euthynnus affinis, the kawakawa or false albacore, a fish species